Khalid Mushir Ismael  (born 14 February 1981 in Duhok, Iraq) is an Iraqi football player of Kurdish ethnicity. He is a midfielder for Duhok FC in Iraq and the Iraq national football team. He usually plays as defensive midfielder, but has recently played in a central defender role. Khalid moved to Zakho FC on 14 September 2013.

External links
 

Iraqi footballers
Iraqi Kurdish people
Iraq international footballers
People from Duhok
Living people
1981 births
Kurdish sportspeople
Duhok SC players
Association football defenders
Association football midfielders